Vilu Military Museum, also known as the Vilu War Museum, is a small open air museum in Vilu, on the island of Guadalcanal in the Solomon Islands. The museum houses the remains of American and Japanese equipment left over from the Guadalcanal campaign during World War II.

Description 

The museum was founded by Fred Kona in 1975, who operated the museum until his death in 1994, after which his family took over operations. The museum is open air and contains the remains of Japanese and American aircraft and artillery pieces destroyed during the Guadalcanal campaign of 1942–43, which saw several major battles take place on and around Guadalcanal. Some of the wrecks located in the museum were moved from other locations, and the museum also maintains a number of memorial plaques, including one for the Royal New Zealand Airforce and HMAS Canberra.

The museum was abandoned during a period of civil unrest on Guadalcanal, but later reclaimed. The museum is occasionally visited by American and Japanese tourists.

Collection

Aircraft 
 Grumman F4F-4 Wildcat BuNo 12068
 F4F Wildcat – Only the wing and tail section
 Vought F4U-1 Corsair
 Lockheed P-38F Lightning
 Bell P-39 Airacobra – Only the engine and propeller
 Douglas SBD Dauntless
 Grumman J2F-5 Duck BuNo 00791 – Only the wing and front section of the pontoon
 Mitsubishi G4M1 Model 11 Serial #1570 – Tail code 377. Only the nose section and parts of outer wing panel

Artillery piece 
 Four Type 96 15 cm howitzer c/n 11, 104, 133 and 136
 Type 88 75 mm AA gun
 Turret of the Type 97 ShinHoTo Chi-Ha medium tank

References 

History of the Solomon Islands
1975 establishments in the Solomon Islands
Museums in the Solomon Islands
Buildings and structures in the Solomon Islands